Video Mods is a television series that aired on MTV2. This show turned video game characters into musicians. It was created by Tony Shiff of Big Bear Entertainment in 2003. A pilot aired in December 2003, having been underwritten by Electronic Arts. It was a form of branded entertainment, as the pilot featured characters from their games SSX 3, The Sims 2 and Need for Speed: Most Wanted.

In 2004, MTV2 Head of Programming Alex Coletti commissioned four new episodes which aired that fall. The pilot and all 2004 episodes were produced and directed by Shiff, with Animation Director Kris Renkewitz. In 2005, additional episodes were animated by IBC Digital and Elektrashock.

MTV never cleared the music rights for any purposes beyond their television airings, and for several years, a majority of the episodes have become lost media. In 2022, all of the episodes were unofficially available to view on YouTube, as well as various other sites.

Music videos

Notes

References

External links
 
 

2000s American adult animated television series
2000s American music television series
2004 American television series debuts
2005 American television series endings
American adult animated musical television series
American adult computer-animated television series
MTV2 original programming
Crossover television
Television shows about video games